István Avar (28 May 1905 – 13 October 1977) was a footballer and manager of German descent who at various times competed for both Hungary and Romania. He played for Újpest FC, most famous for playing for the Hungarian national team in the 1934 World Cup. He was born in Arad, Hungary, which became part of Romania in 1920.

With Újpest, Avar won the Mitropa Cup in 1929, being the competition's top scorer with ten goals, and the Coupe des Nations in 1930. After 1941, he became the player-manager of Kaposvári Rákóczi. He died in Kaposvár in 1977, aged 72.

Honours

Player
Újpest FC
 Nemzeti Bajnokság I (4): 1929–30, 1930–31, 1932–33, 1934–35
 Mitropa Cup (1): 1929
 Coupe des Nations 1930
Rapid București
 Romanian Cup (4): 1936–37, 1937–38, 1938–39, 1939–40

International
Hungary
 Central European International Cup: Bronze: 1931-32
 Central European International Cup: Bronze: 1933-35

Coach
Rapid București
 Romanian Cup (2): 1938–39, 1939–40

Individual
 Central European International Cup top scorer: 1931-32 - 8 goals
 Divizia A 73 matches – 56 goals
 First Division Hungary 150 matches – 162 goals
 Topscorer of Divizia A 1940 – 21 goals
 European Cups (Mitropa Cup) (7 matches – 1 goal)

References

External links 
 
 

1905 births
1977 deaths
Sportspeople from Arad, Romania
People from the Kingdom of Hungary
Hungarian people of German descent
Romanian people of German descent
Hungarian footballers
Romanian footballers
Association football forwards
Dual internationalists (football)
Romania international footballers
Hungary international footballers
1934 FIFA World Cup players
Vagonul Arad players
Colțea Brașov players
Újpest FC players
FC Rapid București players
Hungarian football managers
Romanian football managers
FC Rapid București managers
Liga I players